Idiyappam (Malayalam: ഇടിയപ്പം), also known as string hopper, indiappa (Sinhala: ඉඳිආප්ප), noolputtu (Malayalam: നൂൽപ്പുട്ട്), noolappam (Malayalam: നൂലപ്പം), or ottu shavige (Kannada: ಒತ್ತು ಶಾವಿಗೆ),  is a string hopper dish originating from the Indian state of Kerala and Tamilnadu. It consists of rice flour pressed into noodles, laid into a flat disc-like shape and steamed.

History 
According to food historian K. T. Achaya, idiyappam, appam, idli, dosai and vadai were known during ancient Tamil country the 1st century AD, as per references in the Sangam literature. Lokopakara (1025 CE) cookbook in Kannada language also mentions method of making shavige and mold-presser used for it.

Distribution 
Idiyappam is a culinary speciality throughout the Indian states of Tamil Nadu, Kerala, Karnataka and in Sri Lanka. The name idiyappam derives from the Tamil. The Tamil word idi (meaning beat) and appam, (meaning pancake) together forms a new name for the version of Appam dish. The dish is also, frequently, called noolappam or noolputtu, originating from the Tamil and Malayalam word nool, meaning string or thread. In Karnataka, it is known as Ottu Shavige in Kannada and it is also termed semige or semé da addae in Tulu in Mangalore and Udupi. In Karnataka distinction between Ottu Shavige (unbroken shavige) and shavige is made based on different recipes. In Mangalore and Udupi it is eaten with Tuluva chicken or fish curry, and a coconut milk dish called rasayana. It is also a common breakfast item in Malaysia & Singapore, where it is called Puttu Mayam, typically served with brown sugar and grated coconut.

Preparation 

It is made of rice flour, salt and water. In most parts of Tamil nadu and Kerala Idiyappam is steamed after making sevai, while in the Kongu region of Tamil Nadu, the steamed rice flour ball is pressed to make Idiyappam, a reverse process more similar to Ottu Shavige in neighboring Karnataka. It is generally served as the main course at breakfast or dinner together with a curry (potato, egg, fish or meat curry or rasam) and coconut chutney. It is served with coconut milk and sugar in the Malabar region of Kerala. It is not usually served at lunch. In other parts of Tamil Nadu, Kerala and Sri Lanka, it is mostly eaten with spicy curries or rasam. Using wheat flour in its preparation gives it a brownish hue.

Mix rice flour with hot water, optionally add ghee, season with salt. Knead into a smooth dough. Fill an 'idiyappam' press or a sieve with the dough and press the noodles onto banana leaves or directly into an idli steamer. Add a little grated coconut if desired. Steam for 5–10 minutes. The idiyappam is served with coconut gratings (Pol sambola) and coconut milk (Kiri hodi).

The process for making putu mayam consists of mixing rice flour or idiyappam flour with water or coconut milk, and pressing the dough through a sieve to make vermicelli-like noodles. These are steamed, usually with the addition of juice from the aromatic pandan leaf (screwpine) as flavouring. The noodles are served with grated coconut and jaggery, or, preferably, gur (date palm sugar). In some areas, gula melaka (coconut palm sugar) is the favourite sweetener. Putu piring is a version of putu mayam in which the rice flour dough is used to form a small cake around a filling of coconut and gur or jaggery.

Serving 

This dish may be eaten for breakfast with a vegetable stew or aviyal, or a fish curry, etc. The same liking for serving the slightly sweet putu mayam, putu piring, or cendol with savoury dishes also occurs in Malaysia and Singapore. Idiyappam is typical of Tamil Nadu, Kerala and other southern Indian states, as well as Sri Lanka. A very finely ground, commercial iddiyapam flour is sold as a sort of "instant" way to make all of these dishes.

In Malaysia and Singapore, putu mayam and its relatives are commonly sold as street food from market stalls or carts, as well as being made at home, and are usually served cold. In Indonesia, putu mayam is called Putu mayang and is served with palm sugar mixed with coconut milk.

Gallery

See also 
Kueh tutu
Cuisine of Singapore
Malaysian cuisine
Indian cuisine
Indonesian cuisine
List of steamed foods
Aush
Rice noodles
Rice vermicelli

References

External links 

Articles containing video clips
Indonesian rice dishes
Kerala cuisine
Kue
Malaysian rice dishes
Singaporean rice dishes
Sri Lankan egg dishes
Steamed foods
Tamil cuisine
Indonesian noodle dishes
Malaysian noodle dishes
Singaporean noodle dishes
Sri Lankan noodle dishes